Éric Charles Heidsieck (born 21 August 1936) is a French classical pianist.

Biography 
Born in Reims, Heidsieck gave his first recital at the age of nine and his first concert with orchestra a year later.

He studied with Marcel Ciampi then Alfred Cortot and followed Wilhelm Kempff's lessons on Beethoven.

In 1959, he won the Grand Prix du Disque (EMI) for the recording of Mozart's Concerto No. 21 and No. 24. The following year, he and his wife Tania, also a pianist, founded a duo that shone on stages around the world.

In 1969, Heidsieck was the first French pianist of the 20th century to give, by memory and in public, Beethoven's 32 Sonatas, which he recorded with EMI Classics between 1970 and 1974 and again ten years later, then in 1997. He specializes in the performance and recording of integrals.

Since the beginning of his career, Heidsieck has given more than 2000 concerts around the world. He has also given numerous masterclasses in France and abroad.

In France, he has taught for 18 years at the Conservatoire national supérieur de musique et de danse de Lyon.

From 1957 to 2004, he recorded about 100 discs.

He is also the composer of several cycles of melodies.

References

External links 
 Official website
 Éric Heidsieck (Bach Cantatas Website)
 Éric Heidsieck on Symétrie
 Éric Heidsieck (Opera Musica)
 Éric Heidsieck on  Discogs
 Éric Heidsieck on France Musique
 Bach - Partita No. 6 in E minor, BWV 830 (Éric Heidsieck) (YouTube)

20th-century French male classical pianists
1936 births
Living people
École Normale de Musique de Paris alumni
Academic staff of the Conservatoire de Paris
21st-century French male classical pianists